Archaeological Study Bible: An Illustrated Walk Through Biblical History, first published in 2005 by Zondervan, is a study Bible with reference materials that highlight archaeological, historical, and cultural research related to various passages.

Overview
Archaeological Study Bible uses the New International Version translation of the Bible text and was edited by Walter Kaiser, Jr. and Duane Garrett. 

It has been noted as surpassing Zondervan's NIV Study Bible which had been the top-selling study Bible for more than twenty years, and was awarded the 2007 Gold Medallion Book Award for Bibles.

References

External links
Archaeological Study Bible Website
Difference Between God & Jesus Christ

Study Bibles
2005 non-fiction books
2005 in Christianity
Zondervan books